Chamaemyces is a genus of fungi in the family Agaricaceae. It was circumscribed by mycologist Franklin Sumner Earle in 1906.

References

Agaricaceae
Agaricales genera